Robert John McLeod (April 30, 1930 – December 8, 2022) was a Canadian ice hockey player and coach. He played professionally for the New York Rangers for parts of six seasons from 1949 to 1954, and played eight seasons of senior hockey between 1953 and 1965, where he competed at multiple Ice Hockey World Championships, winning the gold medal in 1961. He served as head coach of the Canada men's national ice hockey team from 1966 to 1969, leading them to two bronze medals at the World Championships and a bronze medal at the 1968 Winter Olympics. He later coached the Saskatoon Blades in the Western Canada Hockey League from 1971 to 1979, and coached the Canada men's national junior team to a silver medal at the 1975 World Junior Championships. He was inducted into the Saskatchewan Sports Hall of Fame in 1984, and inducted as a player into the IIHF Hall of Fame in 1999.

Hockey career
Robert John McLeod was born on April 30, 1930 in Regina, Saskatchewan.

He began his junior hockey career with the Notre Dame Hounds, coached by Athol Murray. Playing with the Moose Jaw Canucks, he won a Western Canada Junior Hockey League championship during the 1948–49 season. He began the 1949–50 season playing for the Moose Jaw Canucks, then finished the year with the New York Rangers in the National Hockey League (NHL). He made his professional debut at age 19, on December 4, 1949, in a 4–0 victory versus the Chicago Black Hawks. He played portions of the next five seasons in the NHL and in the minor leagues, and completed his NHL career in 1955, with 106 games played, 14 goals and 23 assists scored. In the minor leagues, McLeod played the 1951–52 season for the Cincinnati Mohawks in the American Hockey League, followed by eight seasons in the Western Hockey League. He played portions of five seasons for the Saskatoon Quakers, portions of three seasons for the Vancouver Canucks, and one season for the Calgary Stampeders. 

McLeod retired from playing professional hockey in 1960, then spent the 1960–61 season playing senior hockey for the Trail Smoke Eaters in the Western International Hockey League. The Smoke Eaters represented the Canada men's national team, and won gold at the 1961 World Championships. McLeod scored two goals and one assist in a 5–1 victory versus the Soviet Union men's national team, which determined first place on the final day of the championships.

During the 1961–62 season, McLeod served as player-coach of the Moose Jaw Pla-Mors in the Saskatchewan Senior Hockey League. At the end of the season, he was added to the Galt Terriers who represented Canada at the 1962 World Championships and won a silver medal, after losing to the Sweden men's national team in the final game. He played for the Saskatoon Quakers for the 1962–63 season, and was added to the Trail Smoke Eaters for the 1963 World Championships, and placed fourth. He then returned to the Saskatoon Quakers, where he played the 1963–64 season. 
			
McLeod played the 1964–65 season with the Moose Jaw Pla-Mors, while also coaching the Moose Jaw Canucks in the Saskatchewan Junior Hockey League. In 1966, Father David Bauer recruited McLeod to become coach of the Canada men's national team on a permanent basis, since they had a similar coaching style of being good listeners to players.

At the 1966 World Championships, McLeod led Canada as a player-coach to a third-place finish and a bronze medal. He later coached Canada to a bronze medal at the 1967 World Championships, a bronze medal at the 1968 Winter Olympics, and a fourth-place finish at the 1969 World Championships. The Canada men's national team was disbanded in 1970, when Canada withdrew from international men's competition.

McLeod coached the Saskatoon Blades in the Western Canada Hockey League from 1971 to 1979, and reached the league finals in the 1972–73, 1974–75, and 1975–76 seasons. He also served as general manager of the team, and was a part-owner from 1976 to 1980. He also coached the Canada men's national junior team to a silver medal at the 1975 World Junior Championships, held in Canada and the United States.

Honours and awards
McLeod was inducted into the BC Sports Hall of Fame in 1976, as a team member of the 1960–61 Trail Smoke Eaters. He was inducted into the Saskatchewan Sports Hall of Fame in 1984, inducted as a player into the IIHF Hall of Fame in 1999, and inducted into the Saskatchewan Hockey Hall of Fame in 2015. The Saskatoon Blades recognize McLeod as a team builder, with a banner for him hanging above the rink inside the SaskTel Centre. He also received the Western Hockey League Governors Award in the 2005–06 season.

Personal life
McLeod was a recreational pilot, and had a twin sister. He was married to Beverly Evans McLeod, and had a son and daughter.

McLeod died on December 8, 2022, at St. Paul's Hospital in Saskatoon, Saskatchewan, at age 92. Former national team player Morris Mott remembered McLeod by writing, "He was a great teammate and coach on the national hockey team. A great goal scorer despite his low velocity shot."

Career statistics

Regular season and playoffs

International

References

External links
 

1930 births
2022 deaths
Calgary Stampeders (WHL) players
Canada men's national ice hockey team coaches
Canadian ice hockey right wingers
Cincinnati Mohawks (AHL) players
Ice hockey people from Saskatchewan
Ice hockey player-coaches
IIHF Hall of Fame inductees
Medalists at the 1968 Winter Olympics
Moose Jaw Canucks players
New York Rangers players
Notre Dame Hounds players
Saskatoon Blades coaches
Saskatoon Quakers players
Sportspeople from Regina, Saskatchewan
Vancouver Canucks (WHL) players
Western International Hockey League players